Power Belongs to the People formerly known as Parliamentary Group Ano Turtiainen (AT), is a political party in Finland. Ano Turtiainen is its group leader and only member of parliament. The group's rules state that the purpose of the group's activities is "to act in parliament in the interests of Finland and Finns and to have freedom of speech in elections". The group's secretary is James Hirvisaari.

History

Parliamentary group 

The parliamentary group in the Parliament of Finland was founded in June 2020 by Ano Turtiainen when he was sacked from the Finns Party parliamentary group, because of a tweet that was claimed as racist, which mocked George Floyd and a history of inciting attacks against refugee centers. During 2021 the parliamentary group was renamed Power Belongs to the People and he planned to establish a political party.

Creation of Power Belongs to the People 
Turtiainen was subsequently expelled from the Finns Party altogether, leading to his founding of Power Belongs to the People. The group gathered 5,000 signatures in a single day to form a new party. Three Finns in Espoo and city councillor from Lohja defected to VKK from the Finns party, and were joined by a city councillor from Veteli and current deputy leader Jarno Vähäkainu who left the Finns after posting about executing Somali-Finnish politicians. James Hirvisaari, likewise expelled from the Finns for inviting guests who made nazi salutes in the chamber of parliament, then became the secretary of the party.

Politics
Turtiainen described his party as centre-right and stated support for direct democracy. He also emphasized the importance of Christianity for the Western society and values. Kansan Uutiset describe the party as unequivocally far-right and ethnonationalist, while Keskipohjanmaa called the party's presentation as "radical" and similar to far-right and hard-line right-wing populists.

According to Helsingin Sanomat, the party is pro-Russian which is "completely exceptional in Finland outside of 1970s communists" and several leaders, including Turtiainen and James Hirvisaari have made pro-Russian and pro-Putin statements. Further, the party is connected to and promoted by Johan Bäckman and Janus Putkonen who have recruited combatants for the pro-Russian side in Ukraine, who have then gone to the Russian Imperial Movement training camps in St. Petersburg and become fighters in the Russo-Ukrainian War.

The party is also strongly anti-immigrant, this is especially apparent in Jyväskylä where the party chairman and deputy chairman are members of neo-nazi-linked Nationalist Alliance and at least one of them is a member of the neo-nazi Soldiers of Odin. The party program speaks of the white supremacist Great Replacement conspiracy theory and opposes "the program to replace the [native] population".

Belief in conspiracy theories is also common in the party, and some of the leaders engage in anti-semitic conspiracy theories and QAnon.

The party opposed sanctions on Russia and demanded that they would be stopped.

References

External links 
 

Anti-immigration politics in Europe
Anti-vaccination organizations
Political parties established in 2020
Organizations established for the COVID-19 pandemic
Finnish nationalism
Finns Party breakaway groups
Registered political parties in Finland
2020 establishments in Finland
Nationalist parties in Finland
Eurosceptic parties in Finland
Conservative parties in Finland
Right-wing parties
Opposition to NATO
QAnon